Petrophile nivea is a species of flowering plant in the family Proteaceae and is endemic to southwestern Western Australia. It is a small shrub with crowded cylindrical, sharply-pointed leaves and more or less spherical heads of hairy white or cream-coloured flowers on the ends of branchlets.

Description
The flowers are arranged on the ends of branchlets in sessile, more or less spherical heads  in diameter, with a few narrow egg-shaped involucral bracts at the base.

Taxonomy
Petrophile nivea was first formally described in 2002 by Michael Clyde Hislop and Barbara Lynette Rye in the journal Nuytsia from material collected by Hislop near Warradarge in 1999. The specific epithet (nivea) means "snow-white", referring to the flowers.

Distribution and habitat
This petrophile is only known from a single locality near Eneabba where it grows with other petrophiles in heathland.

Conservation status
Petrophile nivea classified as "Threatened Flora (Declared Rare Flora — Extant)" by the Department of Environment and Conservation (Western Australia).

References

nivea
Eudicots of Western Australia
Endemic flora of Western Australia
Plants described in 2002
Taxa named by Barbara Lynette Rye